Alestopetersius brichardi is a species of African tetras found in the Malebo Pool, the middle Congo River, the Ruki River drainage and the Lomami River in the Democratic Republic of the Congo.

Etymology
The Tetra is named in honor of aquarium-fish exporter Pierre Brichard (1921-1990).

References

Paugy, D., 1984. Characidae. p. 140-183. In J. Daget, J.-P. Gosse and D.F.E. Thys van den Audenaerde (eds.) Check-list of the freshwater fishes of Africa (CLOFFA). ORSTOM, Paris and MRAC, Tervuren. Vol. 1.

Alestidae
Fish of Africa
Taxa named by Max Poll
Fish described in 1967